Saqarchin or Seqerchin may refer to:
 Saqarchin, Tehran
 Seqerchin, Zanjan